William Cook Hanson (May 14, 1909 – June 6, 1995) was a United States district judge of the United States District Court for the Northern District of Iowa and the United States District Court for the Southern District of Iowa.

Education and career

Born in Greene County, Iowa, Hanson received a Bachelor of Arts degree from University of Iowa in 1933. He received a Juris Doctor from University of Iowa College of Law in 1935. He was in private practice of law in Jefferson, Iowa from 1935 to 1955. He was county attorney of Greene County from 1939 to 1947. He was a judge of the Iowa District Court for the 16th Judicial District from 1955 to 1962.

Federal judicial service

Hanson was nominated by President John F. Kennedy on June 23, 1962, to the United States District Court for the Northern District of Iowa and the United States District Court for the Southern District of Iowa, to a new joint seat created by 75 Stat. 80. He was confirmed by the United States Senate on July 13, 1962, and received his commission on July 23, 1962. He served as Chief Judge of the Southern District from 1971 to 1977. He assumed senior status on August 15, 1977. His service was terminated on June 6, 1995, due to his death.

References

Sources
 

1909 births
1995 deaths
20th-century American lawyers
Iowa state court judges
Judges of the United States District Court for the Southern District of Iowa
Judges of the United States District Court for the Northern District of Iowa
United States district court judges appointed by John F. Kennedy
20th-century American judges
University of Iowa alumni
University of Iowa College of Law alumni